Weser is a river in Northwestern Germany.

Weser may also refer to:
Kleine Weser and Werdersee, part of the river until 1968
Vesdre (German name Weser), a river in eastern Belgium
AG Weser, a former  German shipbuilding company
Don Weser (born 1937), retired Australian Test cricket match umpire
Operation Weserübung, the code name for Germany's assault on Denmark and Norway during the Second World War

See also
SS Weser (disambiguation)
Koch-Weser (disambiguation)